Fallbrook Union High School (also referred to as FUHS, Fallbrook High School and FHS) is a public high school located in the rural community of Fallbrook, California. Established in 1893, FUHS is the second-oldest high school in San Diego County. The school teaches students in grades 9 through 12.

Sports
Fallbrook Union High School competes in the Avocado League and in Division IV CIF. In 1986 and 2000 Little Pump varsity football won CIF championships.

The school also competes in the boys' sports of baseball, basketball, cross country, football, golf, lacrosse, rugby, soccer, swimming, tennis, track, volleyball, water polo, and wrestling, as well as competing in the girls' sports of basketball, cross country, field hockey, golf, gymnastics, lacrosse, rugby, soccer, softball, swimming, tennis, track, volleyball, and water polo. Fallbrook's girls' rugby U-18 team have been high school national champions five times: 2011, 2012, 2013, 2014, and 2015.

Extracurriculars
The Fallbrook High School Marching Warriors have competed in both SCSBOA and WBA, placing 5th at the 1A SCSBOA Championships in 2012, and placing 7th at WBA Championships in 2A in Fresno in 2015. In 2016, with their show "The Labyrinth", they placed 6th at WBA Championships in 2A. 
The Color Guard and Winter Guard program has also been very successful, with the 2016 Winterguard show "I Put A Spell on You" taking home a first-place win at WGASC Championships in the Scholastic 3A division. The next season they were promoted another division. On day 1 of championships they received a bronze medal, making the top 15 overall, marking Fallbrook's first time performing in finals in the Scholastic 2A division in the Bren Events Center at UC Irvine. They placed 10th at this event.
The Winter Drumline took home gold medals in the Novice division at ADLA Championships in 2015.

This school also has three awards winning choirs: The Madrigals, Advanced Vocal Ensemble, and the Warrior Choir. There ratings go from Good to Superior. They have also won judges choice awards.

This school also has a drama program that has put on such plays as Shrek the Musical and The Great Gatsby

History
The school was first opened in 1893 for 20 students.

In 1911, the Fallbrook High School board voted for a $20,000 20-year bond for construction of a new high school.

In the 1930s, the Public Works Administration Project approved a grant of $34,000, 45% of the cost of a new auditorium-gymnasium-cafeteria, a pool and grading of a sports field.

In 1934–1938, the student body voted on the school colors of red and white. The athletic teams were named "The Warriors" in honor of the large number of Native-Americans in the student body.

In 1939, Fallbrook Union High School was rated the most outstanding high school in the country by Chicago Farm Foundation.

In 1946, the State Department of Education rated Fallbrook to be the best small high school in California.

In 1948, the State of California declared that the main part of the school building did not meet earthquake standards and was condemned. A new building was built the following year.

In 1953, a $325,000 bond was passed to move the school to a site south of town. The 46,000-square-foot project was delayed due to county-wide strikes by brick masons and an unusually rainy year.

In 1967, a $900,000 bond was passed to add a cafeteria, classrooms and bus-loading facilities.

In 1994, a $23 million bond to improve the facilities and to ease the overcrowding problem was approved by Fallbrook voters. The project included a new gym, performing arts center, agriculture center, media center and vocational arts buildings.

Dr. Robert Thomas also retired in 1994 and Joe Diminicantanio was appointed superintendent. Enrollment had reached an all-time record of 2,300 students.

Construction began during summer 1996 on the five new buildings. Included are a $3.3 million, 27,000-square-foot gymnasium; $5 million performing arts center; $834,000 agricultural center; $4.5 million media center and a $2 million vocational arts building. The project took almost 6 years to complete with the last building opening in the fall of 2000. The impressive Bob Burton Center for the Performing Arts is a joint community-school facility and is named after Bob Burton, the Student Activities Director of thirty years.

In 1997, Diminicantanio retired and Thomas Anthony was appointed as superintendent.

As of 2007, the Fallbrook High School campus is home to a wide range of comprehensive high school offerings and is also home to Oasis and Ivy High School. Collectively the campus provides educational facilities for more than 3,000 students.

In 2016, district residents approved issuing $45 million in bonds for upgrading classrooms and facilities and improving school security. The initiative was passed by 64.75% of voters.

Student population
 1893: 20 students
 1934–1938: 160 students
 1950: 244 students
 1953: 539 students
 1958: 750 students
 1978: 1875 students
 1994: 2300 students
 2007: more than 3000
 2015–2016: 2071 students

Alma mater 
On a group of rolling foothills
Stands a building we adore.

Tis the Fallbrook Union High School
One we'll love forever more.

When we leave this school for greater
And hail their colors bright,

We'll not forget old Fallbrook,
And the dear old red and white.

There are schools both great and mighty,
There are schools both great and small,

But there's one good thing we’re sure of,
Old Fallbrook beats them all.

We are loyal to our colors
For them we love to fight.

There's not a thing we love more
Than the dear old red and white.

Notable alumni

 Matt Chico, former pitcher for the Washington Nationals of Major League Baseball
 John Dutton, former professional quarterback
 Mike Leake, pitcher for the Seattle Mariners of Major League Baseball
 Donny Lucy, former MLB catcher for the Chicago White Sox
 Ryan Plackemeier, former punter of the National Football League
 Arielle Vandenberg (Class of 2004), actress and model
 Paula Tiso, voice-over actress, broadcast television voice-over
 Howard Keel, actor and singer
 Michael Curtis, television writer and producer (Friends, "JONAS")
 Brent Noon, shot putter
 Janice Eberly, former Assistant Secretary of the Treasury for Economic Policy and Chief Economist.

References

High schools in San Diego County, California
Educational institutions established in 1893
Public high schools in California
1893 establishments in California